The Deanery of Hartland represents the Church of England in the north west corner of Devon within the Archdeaconry of Barnstaple and the Diocese of Exeter.

Rural Dean of Hartland: The Reverend Penelope Dobbin

Benefice of Hartland Coast

Parishes within the benefice:

Alwington (St Andrew)
Buckland Brewer (St Mary and St Benedict)
Bucks Mills (St Anne)
Clovelly (All Saints; St Peter's Chapel)
Hartland (Saint Nectan)
Lundy (St Helen)
Parkham (St James)
Welcombe (St Nectan)
Woolfardisworthy West (All Hallows)

Clergy and readers:

 Jane Skinner - team Rector (Parkham, Alwington, Buckland Brewer, Hartland, Welcombe, Clovelly, Woolfardisworthy West, Bucks Mills and Lundy)
 Madeline Bray - team vicar (Parkham, Alwington and Buckland Brewer)
 Jane Hayes - team curate 
 Andrew MacWilliam - reader
 Margaret Rickard - reader
 Eunice Dunn - reader

Benefice of Torridge Estuary (Bideford)

Parishes within the benefice:
Appledore (St Mary)
Bideford (St Mary; St Peter)
Landcross (Holy Trinity)
Littleham (St Swithin)
Monkleigh (St George)
Northam & Westward Ho! (St Margaret; Holy Trinity)
Weare Giffard (Holy Trinity)

Clergy and readers:
 Clare Rose-Casemore - priest-in-charge
 Ian Lovett - team vicar
 Sandra Juniper - assistant curate
 Alan Glover - self-supporting minister
Glen Yeo - reader
Peter Hooper - reader
Nigel Price - reader
Sarah Cordingley - reader

Benefice of Abbotsham

Clergy:
 Francis Otto - priest in charge

References

Diocese of Exeter
Deaneries of the Church of England